TaqI is a restriction enzyme isolated from the bacterium Thermus aquaticus in 1978. It has a recognition sequence of

 5'TCGA
 3'AGCT

and makes the cut

 5'---T   CGA---3'
 3'---AGC   T---5'

References

Restriction enzymes
Bacterial enzymes